The Broken Circle Breakdown (also known as Alabama Monroe) is a 2012 Belgian drama film directed by Felix van Groeningen with a screenplay by Carl Joos and van Groeningen. It is based on the stage play of the same name by Johan Heldenbergh and Mieke Dobbels.

The film garnered critical acclaim and was selected as the Belgian entry for the Best Foreign Language Film at the 86th Academy Awards, and was on the nominated shortlist. The film was the winner of Best Foreign Film at the 39th César Awards. It was the winner of the 2013 Lux Prize.

Plot
The film is set in Ghent, in the Flemish Region of Belgium, and chronicles the lives of Didier (Johan Heldenbergh) and Elise (Veerle Baetens) over seven years as they fall in love through their passion for bluegrass music. Didier meets Elise in her tattoo parlour and invites her to the performance of his Bluegrass band. They soon fall in love. When Didier discovers Elise has a wonderful voice, she joins their band as a singer. After a few months, Elise discovers she is unexpectedly pregnant. Even though it comes as a shock at first, the couple is happy. Their daughter Maybelle is born and for a few years, they live a happy life and have success with their band.

After her sixth birthday, Maybelle develops cancer and her health quickly deteriorates. She succumbs to it within a year. The death of Maybelle has a devastating effect on Didier and Elise's relationship and their lives. Didier focuses on scientism, especially after George W. Bush opposes embryonic stem cell research under pressure of creationists and the anti-abortion movement. Elise finds solace in spiritualism and reincarnation. The two grow further and further apart until Elise attempts suicide. She is rushed to the hospital but she is found braindead. Didier agrees to stop the artificial respiration. Finally the band plays a song around Elise's deathbed.

Cast
 Johan Heldenbergh as Didier Bontinck / Monroe
 Veerle Baetens as Elise Vandevelde / Alabama
 Nell Cattrysse as Maybelle
 Geert Van Rampelberg as William
 Nils De Caster as Jock
 Robbie Cleiren as Jimmy
 Bert Huysentruyt as Jef
 Jan Bijvoet as Koen
 Blanka Heirman as Denise

Production
The film was shot from 18 July to 8 September 2011 in Belgium.

Soundtrack
The bluegrass soundtrack includes traditional songs  as well as music composed for the film by Bjorn Eriksson. All the music in the band scenes is performed by the actors.

 "Will the Circle Be Unbroken?" See also "Can the Circle Be Unbroken (By and By)"
 "The Boy Who Wouldn't Hoe Corn" by Alison Krauss, Pat Brayer, Jerry Douglas, Dan Tyminski, Barry Bales, and Ron Block 
 "Dusty Mixed Feelings"
 "Wayfaring Stranger"
 "Rueben's Train"
 "Country In My Genes"
 "Further On Up The Road"
 "Where Are You Heading, Tumbleweed?"
 "Over In The Gloryland"
 "Cowboy Man"
 "If I Needed You"	
 "Carved Tree Inn"
 "Sandmountain"
 "Sister Rosetta Goes Before Us"
 "Blackberry Blossom"

Reception

Critical response
The Broken Circle Breakdown has an approval rating of 83% on review aggregator website Rotten Tomatoes, based on 103 reviews, and an average rating of 7.30/10. The website's critical consensus states, "The Broken Circle Breakdown's reach occasionally exceeds its grasp, but overall, it's an intoxicating, finely wrought romance -- and one with a terrific soundtrack to boot". It also has a score of 70 out of 100 on Metacritic, based on 29 critics, indicating "generally favorable reviews".

Boyd van Hoeij of Variety wrote: "Sophisticated cutting brings out the story’s complex emotional undercurrents, though “Breakdown’s” less convincingly scripted second half sputters more often than it shines."
David Rooney of The Hollywood Reporter wrote: "The non-linear structure works extremely well, making the drama a bracing emotional roller coaster of feel-good/feel-bad turns."

Accolades

See also
 List of Belgian submissions for the Academy Award for Best Foreign Language Film
 List of submissions to the 86th Academy Awards for Best Foreign Language Film

References

External links
 
 
 
 
 
 

2012 films
2012 drama films
Belgian drama films
2010s Dutch-language films
Films about cancer
Belgian films based on plays
Films set in Belgium
Films shot in Belgium
Films shot in Ghent
Ghent in fiction
Best Foreign Film César Award winners
Films directed by Felix van Groeningen